Agama kaimosae, the Kakamega agama, is a species of lizard in the family Agamidae. It is a small lizard found in Kenya.

References

Agama (genus)
Reptiles described in 1935
Taxa named by Arthur Loveridge